Pomaderris delicata, commonly known as delicate pomaderris, is a species of flowering plant in the family Rhamnaceae and is endemic to a restricted area of New South Wales. It is a shrub with hairy young stems, elliptic leaves, and clusters of golden-yellow flowers.

Description
The upper surface of the leaves is glabrous and the lower surface densely covered with star-shaped hairs.

Taxonomy
Pomaderris delicata was first formally described in 1997 by Neville Grant Walsh and Fiona Coates and the description was published in the journal Muelleria from specimens collected by Walsh near Goulburn in 1995. The specific epithet (delicata) refers to the "dainty appearance of the plant".

Distribution and habitat
Delicate pomaderris grows in moist forest in sheltered places near streams between Nerrigundah and Brogo in south-eastern New South Wales.

Conservation status
Pomaderris delicata is listed as "critically endangered" under the Australian Government Environment Protection and Biodiversity Conservation Act 1999 and the New South Wales Government Biodiversity Conservation Act 2016. The main threats to the species include road and infrastructure works, and its small population size.

References

delicata
Flora of New South Wales
Plants described in 1997